Jelling is a town in Denmark with a population of 3,658 (1 January 2022), located in Jelling Parish, approximately 10 km northwest of Vejle. The town lies 105 metres above sea level.

Location
Jelling is located in Vejle municipality and Region of Southern Denmark. The town is mainly famous for the Jelling stones, national monuments. 
Until the Municipal Reform of 2007 on 1 January 2007, Jelling was the capital of Jelling municipality. Jelling Sparekasse's slogan was: "If king Gorm was alive today ... we would probably be the country's National Bank."
One source at least claims that Jelling was the capital of an ancient kingdom of Denmark that was known as Jellund.

Infrastructure 
From Jelling it is 56 km to  Herning and Silkeborg, 80 km to Aarhus and 10 km to the regional capital Vejle. Jelling is close to the Østjyske Motorvej – (E45) and Midtjyske Motorvej – (Primary Route 18). Jelling is served by Jelling railway station, located on the Vejle–Holstebro railway line. The stations offers direct InterCityLyn services to Copenhagen and Struer operated by the railway company DSB as well as regional train services to Vejle, Herning and Struer operated by Arriva.

In 2003 Jelling municipality was the first municipality in Denmark to offer its residents wireless Internet connection, up to 4 Mbit broadband, at a distance of up to 10 km from Jelling.

Town centre 
Vejle municipality has executed a reconstruction project in the village centre. The main road, Gormsgade, was closed and a new bypass constructed, leaving space for the monument area of Jelling.

The plan was estimated to cost in the neighbourhood of 250 million DKK (33,5 million €) which included financing allocated by The State of Denmark, Vejle municipality, Haderslev Diocese and other private foundations, among them "AP Møller and Chastine Mc-Kinney Møller Foundation for General Purposes" – which has donated 70 million DKK (10 million €) for the project.

A new culture house and city square was built as additions to the modern village life, while houses were demolished elsewhere to make space for the monument area. Some houses of historical value were preserved in the museum of Den Gamle By in Aarhus.

History
Jelling is an old and important historical town in the history of Denmark. In the Viking Age it served as the royal seat of the first Monarchs of the Kingdom of Denmark. Jelling is the site of a large stone ship and two large burial mounds, the Jelling stones and Jelling Church which are an UNESCO World Heritage Site since 1994. In the North Mound, built between 958 and 959 CE (possibly for King Gorm of Denmark), an empty burial chamber was found. The South Mound was built around 970 and contains no burial. Beneath the two mounds is a large stone ship from around the end of the 9th century. Between the two mounds stand two rune stones, the Jelling stones. Near the stones, Gorm's son King Harald Bluetooth built a wooden church (965), and beneath it re-interred (965–966) the remains of his father.

Local culture 
The Jelling Music Festival is held annually and is currently Denmark's third largest festival. Bredagerskolen (situated in Jelling) is the largest school in Vejle municipality. The school currently has 810 students (2009) divided into 0–9 classes over 2–5 traces. The village houses the CVU Lillebælt, which trains teachers and educators. There are three grocery stores in Jelling, two gas stations, three garages, two banks, two breweries, and some other stores. The newly opened town house is to house Borgerservice, a library, a cinema, a café, and one of the two breweries.

Notable people 
 Gorm the Old (900-958) ruler of Denmark, reigning from c.936 to his death c.958; he ruled from Jelling, and made the oldest of the Jelling Stones
 Nielsine Paget (1858 in Jelling – 1932) a New Zealand homemaker and community worker

References

External links

Cities and towns in the Region of Southern Denmark
Viking Age populated places
Vejle Municipality